The 2020 AFC Cup was an abandoned season of the AFC Cup which would have been the 17th edition of the competition, Asia's secondary club football tournament organized by the Asian Football Confederation (AFC).

The competition was suspended due to the COVID-19 pandemic after group stage matches on 11 March 2020, and was originally to restart on 23 September 2020. However, the season was eventually cancelled by the AFC on 10 September 2020.

Al-Ahed of Lebanon were the defending champions.

Association team allocation
The 46 AFC member associations (excluding the associate member Northern Mariana Islands) were ranked based on their national team's and clubs' performance over the last four years in AFC competitions, with the allocation of slots for the 2019 and 2020 editions of the AFC club competitions determined by the 2017 AFC rankings (Entry Manual Article 2.3):
The associations were split into five zones:
West Asia Zone consisted of the associations from the West Asian Football Federation (WAFF).
Central Asia Zone consisted of the associations from Central Asian Football Association (CAFA).
South Asia Zone consisted of the associations from the South Asian Football Federation (SAFF).
ASEAN Zone consisted of the associations from the ASEAN Football Federation (AFF).
East Asia Zone consisted of the associations from the East Asian Football Federation (EAFF).
All associations which did not receive direct slots in the AFC Champions League group stage were eligible to enter the AFC Cup.
In each zone, the number of groups in the group stage was determined based on the number of entries, with the number of slots filled through play-offs same as the number of groups:
In the West Asia Zone and the ASEAN Zone, there were three groups in the group stage, including a total of 9 direct slots, with the 3 remaining slots filled through play-offs.
In the Central Asia Zone, the South Asia Zone, and the East Asia Zone, there was one group in the group stage, including a total of 3 direct slots, with the 1 remaining slot filled through play-offs.
The top associations participating in the AFC Cup in each zone as per the AFC rankings received at least one direct slot in the group stage (including losers of the AFC Champions League qualifying play-offs), while the remaining associations get only play-off slots:
For the West Asia Zone and the ASEAN zone:
The associations ranked 1st to 3rd each received two direct slots.
The associations ranked 4th to 6th each received one direct slot and one play-off slot.
The associations ranked 7th or below each received one play-off slot.
For the Central Asia Zone, the South Asia Zone, and the East Asia zone:
The associations ranked 1st to 3rd each received one direct slot and one play-off slot.
The associations ranked 4th or below each received one play-off slot.
The maximum number of slots for each association was one-third of the total number of eligible teams in the top division.
If any association did not use its direct slots, they would be redistributed to the highest eligible association, with each association limited to a maximum of two direct slots.
If any association did not use its play-off slots, they are annulled and not redistributed to any other association.
If the number of teams in the play-offs in any zone was fewer than twice the number of group stage slots filled through play-offs, the play-off teams of the highest eligible associations would be given byes to the group stage.

Association ranking
For the 2020 AFC Cup, the associations were allocated slots according to their association ranking as at 15 December 2017. This took into account their performance in the AFC Champions League and the AFC Cup, as well as their national team's FIFA World Rankings, during the period between 2014 and 2017.

Notes

Teams
The following 48 teams from 28 associations entered the competition. Teams from Brunei and Timor-Leste entered the AFC Cup for the first time.

Notes

Schedule
The schedule of the competition is as follows. Due to the COVID-19 pandemic, only some of the group stage matches on matchdays 1–3 in February and March were played as scheduled, and all matches in the East Asia Zone, on matchdays 2–6 in the Central Asia Zone and the South Asia Zone, and on matchdays 4–6 in the West Asia Zone and the ASEAN Zone, were postponed until further notice. The West Asia Zonal semi-finals were also initially moved to 24–25 August and 14–15 September.

The AFC announced the calendar of the remaining matches on 9 July 2020, with all group stage matches played at centralised venues, and all knockout ties played as a single match. The AFC announced the cancellation of the remainder of the competition on 10 September 2020, due to logistics in coordinating the five zones.

Notes:
W: West Asia Zone
C: Central Asia Zone
S: South Asia Zone
A: ASEAN Zone
E: East Asia Zone
Italics: planned new dates after restart, before the cancellation of the tournament

The original schedule of the competition, as planned before the pandemic, was as follows.

Qualifying play-offs

Preliminary round 1

Preliminary round 2

Play-off round

Group stage

Group A

Group B

Group C

Group D

Group E

Group F

Group G

Group H

Group I

Top scorers

See also
2020 AFC Champions League

References

External links
, the-AFC.com
AFC Cup 2020, stats.the-AFC.com

 
2
2020
Association football events curtailed and voided due to the COVID-19 pandemic